Üzümçü is a village in the municipality of Bədəlli in the Gobustan Rayon of Azerbaijan.

References

Populated places in Gobustan District